Princess Helene of Hohenlohe-Langenburg (22 November 1807 – 5 September 1880) was a member of the House of Hohenlohe-Langenburg and a Princess of Hohenlohe-Langenburg by birth and a member of the House of Württemberg and a Duchess of Württemberg as the second wife of Duke Eugen of Württemberg

Family
Helene was the twelfth child and the ninth daughter of Karl Ludwig III, Prince von Hohenlohe-Langenburg and his wife Countess Amalie Henriette of Solms-Baruth. She was a younger sister of Ernst I, Prince of Hohenlohe-Langenburg, brother-in-law of Queen Victoria of the United Kingdom.

Marriage and issue
On 11 September 1827 Princess Helene married Duke Eugen of Württemberg (1788–1857), son of Duke Eugen of Württemberg (1758–1822) and Princess Luise of Stolberg-Gedern (1764–1828), first cousin of the better known Countess of Albany. Duke Eugen was a widower of Princess Mathilde of Waldeck and Pyrmont (1801–1825), daughter of George I, Prince of Waldeck and Pyrmont by whom he had had three children. By Helene, Duke Eugen had other four children:
Duke William of Württemberg (20 July 1828 – 5 November 1896)
Duchess Alexandrine Mathilde of Württemberg (16 December 1829 – 2 September 1913)
 Duke Nicholas of Württemberg (1 March 1833 – 22 February 1903), married in 1868 his niece Duchess Wilhelmine of Württemberg, no issue.
 Duchess Agnes of Württemberg (13 October 1835 – 10 July 1886), married in 1858 to Heinrich XIV, Prince Reuss Younger Line, had issue.

Ancestry

References

1807 births
1880 deaths
House of Hohenlohe-Langenburg
People from Langenburg
Princesses of Hohenlohe-Langenburg
Duchesses of Württemberg